Saturday Night Football is the name given to college football broadcasts on Saturday nights on the American Broadcasting Company (ABC) television network.

Saturday Night Football may also refer to:

NFL on DuMont, which ran on Saturday nights from 1951 to 1955
Thursday Night Football, which included Saturday Night Football from 2006 to 2008
ESPN College Football Saturday Primetime
Saturday Night Football (UK TV programme), 2013–2016